"I Love It" is a song by Swedish duo Icona Pop featuring vocals from British recording artist Charli XCX. It was released as a single in May 2012 as a digital download in Sweden, where it peaked at number two on the singles chart. The song was added to their debut studio album, Icona Pop, as well as their EP Iconic and their debut international album, This Is... Icona Pop. "I Love It" was written by Charli XCX, Patrik Berger, and Style of Eye, with production handled by the latter two.

The song received positive reviews from music critics, and publications Rolling Stone and Pitchfork included it on their year-end lists for 2012. The song went on to become Icona Pop and Charli XCX's first US hit, peaking at number seven on the Billboard Hot 100 and was certified five times platinum by the Recording Industry Association of America, denoting over 5 million units sold in the United States. In June 2013, over a year after it was released elsewhere, the song charted at number 1 on the UK Singles Chart. It has gone on to sell 4.3 million certified downloads.

Background

The song was originally written by Charli XCX, whom Icona Pop met several times in London. Swedish producer Patrik Berger sent Charli two beats, and she quickly wrote songs for each of them, one of which became "I Love It" and the other of which became her following single "You're the One". However, she later stated that she knew she would not end up releasing it herself because she could not reconcile it with her sound.

While recording "Good for You" with Icona Pop, Berger presented them with Charli's work on "I Love It". Band member Aino Jawo said she felt a connection to the song because it mirrored her own experiences, and the line "You're from the 70s but I'm a 90s bitch" reminded her of an older man she had known. Member Caroline Hjelt described Charli XCX's original demo as "more cute, in a way…really cool and cocky". Icona Pop approached Swedish producer Style of Eye to make a rougher version of the track, telling him, "We want the punkiness. We want the 'fuck it' feeling."

Composition

"I Love It" is set in common time with a tempo of 126 beats per minute (Allegro), and is described as an electropop and dance-pop song. It is written in A♭ major, with an authentic cadence for the main chord progression. Billboard critic Jessica Hopper defined the instrumental by its "swells of revving synths" and prominent sub-bass sounds. Pitchfork writer Lindsay Zoladz commented that the song was "basically just two-and-a-half minutes of drop"; colleague Larry Fitzmaurice noted the track's maximalist approach fit the contemporary trends in electronic and pop music.

The song's lyrics describe breaking up with an older boyfriend. In its chorus, Icona Pop and Charli XCX shout in unison "I don't care / I love it". Critics compared the song's breakup narrative to Kelly Clarkson's 2004 single "Since U Been Gone", and journalist Chuck Eddy wrote in a piece for Spin that the track's brattiness was similar to British band Shampoo.

Release and promotion
"I Love It" was released in Sweden in May 2012. It entered the Swedish Singles Chart the following month at number 48, and after two months on the chart, the song peaked at number two for three consecutive weeks. After its January 2013 appearance on an episode of Girls, the song performed better in digital downloads than it had upon initial release. Ten days later it entered the Billboard Hot 100, eventually climbing to number seven on the chart. Jawo and Hjelt's first performance with Charli XCX happened in April 2013, after seeing her back stage at a South by Southwest showcase where both acts were playing.

In June 2013, several cover versions of the song entered the UK Singles Chart, including one by vlogger Venus Angelic. When Icona Pop released their version, it entered at the top of the chart, overtaking Robin Thicke's "Blurred Lines" featuring T.I. and Pharrell Williams.

Critical reception
"I Love It" was met with positive reviews from music critics. The song placed 15th on The Village Voices 2012 Pazz & Jop list, and it rose to eighth place the following year. Pitchfork Media labeled it "Best New Music", calling the song "delectable, empowering, infinitely repeatable". Pitchfork later listed the song number 50 on its "Top 100 Tracks of 2012" list. Rolling Stone placed "I Love It" at number 35 on its year-end list, naming it "the Euro-slut club jam of the summer". Amrit Singh for Stereogum described it as "fun", Heather Phares commented Jawo and Hjelt "half-sung, half-shouted vocals and revved-up synths make the song inescapably catchy". Kat Bein of the Miami New Times called the song a "feminist pop anthem". In 2019, Stereogum and Pitchfork ranked the song as the 117th and 197th best song of the 2010s respectively.

Music video
The music video for "I Love It" was directed by Fredrik Etoall. The video was shot in a day by friends of the band while they were in Paris. It shows Jawo and Hjelt playing a show for a crowd shouting the lyrics and dancing, with additional shots from backstage and an after-party. It also includes outdoor shots of them wearing fringed jackets that they made. Charli XCX does not appear in the video.

Track listing

Charts

Weekly charts

Year-end charts

Decade-end charts

All-time chart

Sales and certifications

Cover versions
Several cover versions have charted in the UK.

In 2013, this song is featured on the season finale of the fourth season of Glee, "All or Nothing". The song is performed by Tina Cohen-Chang (Jenna Ushkowitz), Kitty Wilde (Becca Tobin), Unique Adams (Alex Newell), and Brittany Pierce (Heather Morris). 

In 2017, Swedish singer Moneybrother released a punk rock inspired cover version of the song as a part of the eighth season of Så mycket bättre. The track received mixed to positive reviews, ultimately failing to chart.

Release history

References

2012 singles
Songs written by Patrik Berger (record producer)
Icona Pop songs
Charli XCX songs
Number-one singles in Scotland
UK Singles Chart number-one singles
Songs written by Charli XCX
2012 songs
Songs with feminist themes
Songs written by Style of Eye
Atlantic Records singles
Big Beat Records (American record label) singles
Warner Records singles
Electronic dance music songs
Electropop songs